Brandy Fluker Oakley (born August 13, 1983) is an American politician serving as the U.S. State Representative for Massachusetts's 12th Suffolk State House district since 2021. Her district includes part of Milton in Norfolk County, Hyde Park, Mattapan, and part of Boston in Suffolk County. She is a member of the Democratic Party.

Personal life
Fluker Oakley is the only child of Rev. Brenda A. Fluker, Esq. and the middle child of Joseph G. Oakley. She was born and grew up in Boston, Massachusetts. She attended Boston Latin School.

Fluker Oakley attended Syracuse University, where she obtained bachelor's degrees in both social work and policy studies. She taught-third grade, as a member of the Baltimore Teachers’ Union before attending law school at Emory University. Fluker Oakley became a public defender with the Committee for Public Counsel Services in the Boston Municipal and Chelsea District Courts.

Political career
Fluker Oakley won the Democratic Party's primary election for Massachusetts House of Representatives 12th District on September 1, 2020. She ran unopposed in the general election on November 3, 2020. She replaced Democrat Dan Cullinane, who represented the 12th Suffolk district for seven years. She is a member of the women's caucus and the Massachusetts Black and Latino Legislative Caucus.

Committees
Joint Committee on Community Development and Small Businesses
Joint Committee on Racial Equity, Civil Rights, and Inclusion
Joint Committee on the Judiciary
Joint Committee on Transportation

See also
 2021–2022 Massachusetts legislature

References

Sources
https://www.electbrandy.com/meet-brandy
https://malegislature.gov/Legislators/Profile/BFO1/Bills
https://www.baystatebanner.com/2020/09/02/brandi-fluker-oakley-wins-12th-suffolk-primary/
https://apps.bostonglobe.com/metro/graphics/2021/02/nr-apps-black-history-month/
https://www.dotnews.com/2021/committee-assignments-allotted-dot-delegation

1983 births
Living people
20th-century African-American women
21st-century African-American women
African-American state legislators in Massachusetts
Democratic Party members of the Massachusetts House of Representatives
Public defenders
Women state legislators in Massachusetts